U.S. Route 71 or U.S. Highway 71 (US 71) is a major north–south United States highway that extends for over 1500 miles (2500 km) in the central United States. This original 1926 route has remained largely unchanged by encroaching Interstate highways. Currently, the highway's northern terminus is in International Falls, Minnesota at the Canada–US border, at the southern end of the Fort Frances-International Falls International Bridge to Fort Frances, Ontario. U.S. Route 53 also ends here. On the other side of the bridge, Trans-Canada Highway (Highway 11) is an east–west route while Highway 71 is a north–south route. US 71's southern terminus is between Port Barre and Krotz Springs, Louisiana at an intersection with U.S. Route 190. For the entirety south of Kansas City, Missouri, US 71 runs parallel and concurrent with the existing and future Interstate 49. North of Kansas City, US 71 runs halfway between Interstate 29 and Interstate 35, which they split in the city at an interchange with Interstate 70.

Route description

Louisiana
The southern terminus of US 71 is located in Louisiana, beginning between Port Barre and Krotz Springs, at an intersection with U.S. 190. The highway follows a northwesterly course through Louisiana, passing through the communities of Alexandria, Montgomery, Coushatta, and Shreveport. From its southern terminus to Shreveport, US 71 has largely been superseded by Interstate 49 - which is eventually planned to roughly follow the US 71 alignment as far north as Kansas City, Missouri. After Shreveport, US 71 follows a northerly course, crossing into Arkansas just north of Ida, Louisiana.

Arkansas and Texas

The route enters Arkansas near the Red River, and runs north through the communities of Doddridge and Fouke. Most motorists can now bypass US 71 from Doddridge to Texarkana via Interstate 49.

Inside the loop, Highway 71 becomes East Street, passing the Texarkana Country Club and Hobo Jungle Park before becoming Hickory Street in downtown Texarkana. The street is four-lane undivided, passing the Bottoms House and J.K. Wadley House before meeting US 67/US 82. US 71 forms a short, two-block concurrency with US 67/US 82 before turning north along Hazel Street. This minor city street runs northwest to intersect State Line Avenue; at this point, the northbound lanes are in Arkansas, while the southbound lanes are in Texas. While on State Line Avenue, US 71 intersects Loop 14 before U.S. Route 59 joins US 71 at Interstate 30.

From Arkansas Highway 296 north of Texarkana to the Red River, US 71 runs concurrent with US 59 as an expressway.

The highways re-enter Arkansas (specifically Little River County) completely at the Red River. US 59/US 71 serve as an eastern terminus for Highway 380 upon entering Ogden. Although US 59/US 71 bypass the community as a four-lane highway, the route formerly served Ogden as Grand Street, which as of 2011 retains original 1926 US 71 paving for some of its length. Further north the routes pass under Highway 32, which skirts the southern part of Ashdown. Serving Little River's county seat as Constitution Avenue, the routes become a five-lane road with center turn lane which passes within two blocks of the Little River County Courthouse. The routes intersect Highway 32B and Highway 108 before exiting town due north to Wilton. Following the Kansas City Southern Railroad tracks, US 59/US 71 enters Wilton, where it passes the S. S. P. Mills and Son Building, Highway 234, and the Texarkana and Fort Smith Railway Depot. Just north of town a former alignment comes into view briefly before the Mills Cemetery and the Sevier County line.

Once across the Little River, US 59/US 71 passes another former alignment, crosses through Pond Creek National Wildlife Refuge, and runs east of Ben Lomond before entering Lockesburg. A junction in Lockesburg joins US 59/US 71 with US 371, with Highway 24 running west from the junction.  north of Lockesburg US 70 joins US 59/US 71/US 371, and the concurrent routes turn west to De Queen. Upon entering De Queen, US 59/US 71 turns north, US 70 continues west, US 70 Business/Highway 41 (US 70B/AR 41) runs south, and US 371 terminates at the junction. US 59/US 71 continue through Gillham and Grannis to serve as the western terminus of US 278 in Wickes. Junctions with Highway 246 and Highway 4 precede the route entering Mena, the county seat of Polk County.

In Mena, US 59/US 71 has a brief overlap with Highway 8, during which the routes pass two NRHP listings, the Kansas City-Southern Depot and the Mena Commercial Historic District. US 59/US 71/AR 8 also has an overlap with Highway 88, although the western end of the overlap serves as the eastern terminus of the Talimena Scenic Drive National Scenic Byway designation. After Highway 8 and Highway 88 have left the route US 59/US 71 run north to a junction with US 270 in Acorn. At a fork in the road, US 59 splits onto US 270 west, and US 270 east begins a concurrency with US 71 northbound into Ouachita National Forest. US 71/US 270 continue into Scott County to Y City, where the concurrency ends and US 270 turns east. US 71 runs north through the forest to Waldron, a town the mainline route bypasses to the west while US 71B runs through downtown Waldron. While skirting Waldron, US 71 has a junction with Highway 272 near Waldron Municipal Airport as well as junctions with Highway 248, Highway 80, and Highway 28. This section of US 71 from north of Mena through Fayetteville (following the original sections bypassing the new Interstate 540 has been designated a scenic byway and the Boston Mountains Scenic Loop.

North of Waldron, US 71 passes through Mansfield and Greenwood before intersecting with Interstate 540 on the south end of Fort Smith. US 71 overlaps I-540 for approximately  until it reaches Interstate 40, then follows I-40  to Alma.

US 71 passes through Mountainburg, Winslow, West Fork and Greenland on its way to Fayetteville. At Fayetteville, US 71 continues north to the missouri state line just north of bella vista, Arkansas|Bentonville]], as well as U.S. Route 62.

North of Bentonville US 71 continues another  passing through Bella Vista to the Missouri state line.

Missouri

In Missouri, US 71 is signed as part of the new section of Interstate 49 from Pineville to the southeast side of the Kansas City metro area. The I-49 designation went into effect in December 2012.

On August 15, 2007, the final section of US 71 south of Kansas City to be converted to a 4-lane divided expressway was opened in McDonald County, between the cities of Lanagan and Jane. In Kansas City, I-49/US 71 is one of the components of the Grandview Triangle interchange.  There is a  section near Swope Park that has three at-grade intersections.  Ample right of way exists on the corridor to upgrade to a freeway, though there are no plans to do so in the near future. From downtown Kansas City, US 71 overlaps with Interstate 29 to north of Saint Joseph.  From there, US 71 continues as an expressway to Maryville before angling towards Iowa just north of Clearmont.  In 2002, US 71 was four laned from Interstate 29, northwest of St. Joseph to Maryville. From there, until it enters Iowa at Braddyville, it continues to be the only remaining rural two lane section of this highway north of Kansas City.

US 71 overlaps Interstate 70 on the east side of downtown Kansas City's freeway loop.  US 71 then overlaps Interstate 35 and Interstate 29 for a segment which crosses the Missouri River via the Christopher S. Bond Bridge in Kansas City.  It then continues concurrent with Interstate 29 after separating from Interstate 35 north of the Missouri River to just north of St. Joseph, Missouri where it diverges.

An alternative in the design of Interstate 29 called for it to follow US 71 on a more populated route through Maryville, Missouri and Clarinda, Iowa.  However the interstate was to be routed along the more direct route to Omaha, Nebraska/Council Bluffs, Iowa and more sparsely populated Missouri River bottoms.

During the Great Flood of 1993, when the Missouri River flooded, I-29 traffic was detoured along US 71 through Maryville and Clarinda.

The four-lane segment between Savannah to Maryville was completed in 2002.  It is a two-lane highway north of Maryville to the Iowa state line.  The long delay in bringing a four-lane highway to Maryville even as most of the highway from Savannah south to the Arkansas line has been a four lanes for some time was a source of considerable irritation for Maryville and Northwest Missouri State University.

Outlaws Bonnie and Clyde engaged in a shootout with law enforcement officers in 1933 beside the highway at the Red Crown Tourist Court just southeast of Platte County, Missouri.  The tourist court (which burned down) was just east of the main exit for I-29 Northbound at the old junction with US 71 Bypass now Missouri Route 291.

Iowa
US 71 passes through a rural section of western Iowa.  It enters the state at Braddyville and junctions Interstate 80 near Brayton, northeast of Atlantic.  North of I-80, US 71 passes through Carroll, where it intersects U.S. Route 30, and intersects and overlaps U.S. Route 20 at Sac City and U.S. Route 18 through Spencer.  The highway crosses the Iowa Great Lakes where West Okoboji and East Okoboji Lake meet before exiting the state.

US 71 formerly entered Storm Lake concurrently with Iowa Highway 7 but was moved to a new alignment east of Storm Lake in 1996 to lessen travel time between Carroll and Spencer, the two largest communities on US 71 in Iowa.  A business route of US 71 follows the highway's former alignment through Storm Lake.

A business route for US 71 also passes through Clarinda on a former alignment of US 71.

Minnesota
As is the case in Iowa, US 71 in Minnesota is largely a rural highway. It crosses Interstate 90 at Jackson, passes through Windom, and intersects U.S. Route 14 at Sanborn. It passes through Redwood Falls and Willmar before its junction with Interstate 94/U.S. Highway 52 at Sauk Centre. Around Willmar, US 71 is built to freeway standards. From there, US 71 passes through Long Prairie, Wadena, and Park Rapids before touching Itasca State Park, the source of the Mississippi River. It then crosses the Mississippi and is a major route for northern Minnesota as it goes around Bemidji (the "first city on the Mississippi") and angles northeast to its terminus at the Canada–US border in International Falls. On the Ontario side, Highway 71 links the bridge to Ontario Highway 71 in Fort Frances, which continues north and terminates at Ontario Highway 17 just east of Kenora.

The Minnesota section of US 71 is defined as Routes 4 and 141 in Minnesota Statutes §§ 161.114(2) and 161.115(72).,

History
The original southern terminus of US 71 was in Baton Rouge, Louisiana at the Baton Rouge-Port Allen Mississippi River ferry.  This was also the original western terminus of US 190 which continued east from the ferry landing through Baton Rouge, shortly intersecting US 61.  US 71 was routed along the Jefferson Highway (pre-1955 State Route 1) from Baton Rouge north to Clarence (near Natchitoches).  From Clarence to Shreveport, a more direct route was chosen than that followed by the Jefferson Highway, and US 71 continued north into Arkansas rather than west into Texas.

The current route of US 71 in Louisiana follows or closely parallels the 1926 alignment north of Lebeau.  Between Port Allen and Lebeau, US 71 originally followed present-day LA 76 to Rosedale, LA 77 to Ravenswood, and LA 10 to Lebeau, crossing the Atchafalaya River by ferry at Melville.  In 1935, US 190 was extended west onto a newly built section of State Route 7 (the Evangeline Highway) with a bridge across the Atchafalaya River at Krotz Springs.  The following year, US 71 was moved onto this route, branching northward to Lebeau from its current southern terminus west of Krotz Springs and bypassing the ferry crossing at Melville.  In 1940, US 71 and 190 were moved onto the new Mississippi River Bridge at Baton Rouge, bypassing the ferry crossing there.  US 71 was cut back to its current southern terminus west of Krotz Springs in 1951.

In northwest Arkansas, the 1926 alignment of US 71 followed Highway 102 from Bentonville to Centerton, then north on Highway 102 Business to Highway 72 southeast of Hiwasse. From there, it followed Arkansas 72 to Gravette, where it turned north on Highway 59 to the Missouri state line. In the 1930s, US 71 was rerouted along Arkansas 72 between Bentonville and Gravette, then north on Arkansas 59. This alignment lasted until the early 1960s when it was realigned along Highway 100 between Bentonville and the Missouri state line. In Missouri, the new US 71 replaced Route 88, which had been defined in 1922, while the old US 71 became Route 59.

Highway 71 has a brief concurrency with Highway 237 before crossing over The Loop Interstate 49 instead of (future Interstate 130) in the southeast part of town.

Future

A large section of US 71 through Missouri, Arkansas and Louisiana is being upgraded to Interstate standards as an extension of Interstate 49 from Shreveport, Louisiana to Kansas City, Missouri. It will also connect to New Orleans with "Future I-49" signage being posted, but with no construction, as of 2017, being started.

Major intersections
Louisiana
  west of Krotz Springs
  southeast of Lecompte. The highways travel concurrently to Alexandria.
  in Alexandria
  in Alexandria. The highways travel concurrently to Pineville.
  in Alexandria
  in Tioga. The highways travel concurrently to southeast of Creola.
  in Clarence. The highways travel concurrently to Coushatta.
  in Coushatta. The highways travel concurrently to the Coushatta–Edgefield line.
  in Bossier City. The highways travel concurrently to Shreveport.
  in Shreveport
  in Shreveport
  southeast of Hosston
Arkansas
  south-southeast of Doddridge
  south of Fouke
  in Texarkana
  in Texarkana. The highways travel concurrently to the Texas state line at the Texarkana-Texarkana city line.
  on the Texas state line on the Texarkana–Texarkana, Texas city line. US 59/US 71 travels concurrently to Acorn.
Texas
  north of Texarkana
  north of Texarkana
Arkansas
  in Lockesburg. The highways travel concurrently to De Queen.
  north-northwest of Lockesburg. The highways travel concurrently to De Queen.
  east of De Queen
  in Wickes
  in Acorn. US 71/US 270 travels concurrently to Y City.
  west-southwest of Y City
  in Mansfield
  north of Huntington
  southeast of Fort Smith
  in Fort Smith. The highways travel concurrently to Van Buren.
  in Van Buren
  in Van Buren. The highways travel concurrently to Alma.
  in Alma
  in Fayetteville. The highways travel concurrently to Bentonville.
  in Fayetteville. The highways travel concurrently to Bentonville.
  in Springdale
Missouri
  south of Pineville. The highways travel concurrently to Kansas City.
  in Neosho
  south-southwest of Duenweg. The highways travel concurrently to Fidelity.
  in Lamar
  in Nevada
  in Kansas City. I-470/US 50/US 71 travels concurrently, but on different lanes, through Kansas City.
  in Kansas City
  in Kansas City. I-70/US 40/US 71 travels concurrently through Kansas City.
  in Kansas City. I-29/US 71 travels concurrently to east of Amazonia. I-35/US 71 travels concurrently through Kansas City.
  on the Gladstone–Kansas City city line
  on the Gladstone–Kansas City city line
  in Kansas City
  in Kansas City. The highways travel concurrently to Platte City.
  south-southeast of St. Joseph
  in St. Joseph
  in St. Joseph
  in St. Joseph
  north-northeast of Country Club. The highways travel concurrently to northwest of Savannah.
  in Maryville. The highways travel concurrently to east-southeast of Burlington Junction.
Iowa
  north of Villisca
  in Atlantic. The highways travel concurrently to north-northeast of Lorah.
  north-northeast of Lorah
  in Carroll
  northeast of Sac City and north of Early. The highways travel concurrently between these intersections.
  in Spencer. The highways travel concurrently through Spencer.
Minnesota
  in Jackson
  north of Sanborn
  in Olivia. The highways travel concurrently through Olivia.
  in Willmar
  in Sauk Centre
  in Wadena
  in Bemidji. The highways travel concurrently through Bemidji.
  in International Falls. The highways travel concurrently to the Canada–United States border at Fort Frances, Ontario.
 Central Avenue/Church Street at the Canada–United States border at Fort Frances, Ontario

See also

Related U.S. Routes
 U.S. Route 171
 U.S. Route 271
 U.S. Route 371

Auxiliary and suffixed routes
Auxiliary routes of U.S. Route 71

Notes

References

External links

 Endpoints of U.S. Highway 71

 
71
71
71
71
071
71